Michael Sfard (born 1972) is a lawyer and political activist specializing in international human rights law and the laws of war. He has served as counsel in various cases on these topics in Israel. Sfard has represented a variety of Israeli and Palestinian human rights and peace organizations, movements and activists at the Israeli Supreme Court.

Life and work
Michael Sfard was born in 1972 in the Rehov Brazil public housing complex in Kiryat HaYovel, Jerusalem. 

Sfard is the grandchild of Holocaust survivors. His parents had been expelled from Poland for their involvement in the University of Warsaw student uprisings against the Communist Government in 1968. When he was five, his family moved to an apartment building in Ma'alot Dafna that was home to many journalists. 

Sfard completed a law degree (LLB) at Hebrew University of Jerusalem. 

He was a reservist for the Israeli Defense Forces (IDF) in the Gaza Strip while at law school. He served in the Nahal Brigade of the IDF, mostly in Lebanon, as a military paramedic. According to Sfard, before his reserve duty in Gaza, he believed "left-wing soldiers" should agree to patrol the Palestinian territories "to stop bad things from happening" rather than be conscientious objectors. 

While serving in Gaza his views changed, and in a later reservist session, Sfard became a conscientious objector and spent three weeks in military prison due to his refusal to serve as escort for Israeli settlers in Hebron. He was released from the army in 1994 and attended a course on Jewish-Arab encounters at Neve Shalom. He started his legal apprenticeship with Avigdor Feldman in 1998 and worked with him for several years as an attorney.

In 2000, Sfard and his wife moved to London so that he could pursue a master's degree, but he says it was also "to get away" from Israel. He studied international human rights law, "discovered the subject [he] wanted to work in" and returned the following year having decided that emigration from Israel was "a tragedy". 

He completed his Master of Laws at University College London. Shortly after Sfard returned, he attended the first conference of the group Courage to Refuse, "saw 200 people who thought and felt like [he] did", and decided to be an activist. In early 2004, Sfard opened his own office in Tel Aviv.

Sfard has described Shulamit Aloni as a "major influence" who introduced him through her activities to the world of human rights in Israel.

Sfard's has expressed his views on the role the media play in his work. He feels that "the media are an important part of the work. They are a tool."  In addition, he said that media can influence or create the debate. But, he also said that "I, as any lawyer, have a fear of cameras entering the sanctified zone between the lawyer and the client."

Articles by Sfard have been published by Haaretz, The Independent and The Observer.

Sfard is the grandson of sociologist Zygmunt Bauman and writer Janina Bauman on his mother's side and of Communist Yiddish author David Sfard and Cinema Studies Professor Regina Dreyer on his father's side. His father Leon is a mathematician and his mother Anna Sfard is a Professor of Mathematics Education in the Department of Education at the University of Haifa.

Legal activities
Sfard has represented a variety of Israeli and Palestinian human rights and peace organizations, movements and activists at the Israeli Supreme Court. His clients are "mostly Palestinians who live in the West Bank and need permits to come into Israel." 

According to the New York Times, he has brought many cases to challenge the Israeli occupation of the Palestinian territories, represented hundreds of Israeli soldiers who have refused to serve, with the work mostly being financed "by Israel's premier left-wing nonprofit organizations, which in turn are financed in part by European governments". Sfard and his law office provide legal counsel for Yesh Din. Sfard is legal counsel for Peace Now.

Cases which Sfard has handled include:
 Sfard filed a petition on behalf of a group of Israeli Human Rights organizations against the IDF decision to reduce the size of the humanitarian "safety zone" during bombardments of Gaza.
 Sfard has litigated a case on behalf of the Israeli human rights organization Hamoked, against the "permit system" which governs the area between the separation fence and the 1949 armistice line.
 Sfard represented Peace Now in a petition against settlement outposts. Sfard litigated the case for the demolition of nine houses built illegally on Palestinian private land, in the outpost known as "Amona". He also litigates the case in which Peace Now demands to evacuate an outpost called "Migron".
 A case involving the International Solidarity Movement's Brian Avery, who was wounded during the course of his activities in Jenin. Avery was injured in the head by IDF soldiers. Avery accepted a settlement for NIS 600,000 (USD $150,000) from the state of Israel in exchange for dropping the lawsuit. Shlomo Lecker was his Israeli lawyer and Sfard represented him as well.
 Sfard and co-counsel Carmel Pomerantz, represented 17 Bedouins , who lived near Beer Sheva , claiming the land they were on, including Al-Araqeeb, belonged to them rather than to the State of Israel. The judge ruled in favor of the State saying that the land was not "assigned to the plaintiffs, nor held by them under conditions required by law" and that they still had to "prove their rights to the land by proof of its registration in the Tabu". Furthermore, the judge said that the Bedouins knew they were supposed to register, but didn't, saying "although the complainants are not entitled to compensation, it has been willing to negotiate with them…it is a shame that these negotiations did not reach any agreement." The court ordered the Bedouins to pay legal costs of 50,000NIS.

Reception
The New York Times described Sfard as "the left’s leading lawyer in Israel". 

The New America Foundation described Sfard as "Israel's pre-eminent legal expert on settlements and the challenges posed by the broader infrastructure of Israeli occupation to the daily life of Palestinians, to the two-state solution, to American policy and to Israel's democracy" and "Israel's most respected human rights lawyer".

In 2011, a settler from Kiryat Arba was indicted after calling for his assassination in an Internet posting. 

Israeli Knesset Member Danny Danon of the right-wing Likud party accused Sfard of "trying to bypass democracy" through promoting ideas in the Israeli "legal system because his ideas are not welcome in Israeli society."

Gerald Steinberg, president of NGO Monitor, said that Sfard "sees the courts as the way to force the changes that he perceives as necessary for Israel, [b]ut he doesn't convince the Israeli public. In any democratic process, you can't use just the legal system to impose an ideology." 

Naftali Balanson, Managing Editor of NGO Monitor, said Sfard "is at the center of the NGO industry that exploits the rhetoric of human rights in the context of the Arab-Israeli conflict."

Books
Dov Hanin, Michael Sfard, Sharon Rotbard, editors, The Refusenik Trials: The Military Prosecution of Hagai Matar, Matan Kaminer, Noam Bahat Shimri Tsameret, Adam Maor. The Military Prosecution of Yonatan Ben-Artzi, Babel, 2004.
The Last Spy (2007), the biography of the Soviet spy Marcus Klingberg, written by Klingberg with Sfard.
Homa v'mehdal (English title The Wall of Folly) (2008), about the West Bank barrier, written by Reserves Brigadier General Shaul Arieli and Sfard.
The Wall and the Gate: Israel, Palestine, and the Legal Battle for Human Rights (2018)

References

External links

Living people
1972 births
Israeli lawyers
Hebrew University of Jerusalem Faculty of Law alumni
Alumni of University College London
People from Jerusalem
Israeli soldiers